Cronenwett Island is a high, ice-covered island about  long. It lies between Vollmer Island and Steventon Island in the Marshall Archipelago, off the coast of Marie Byrd Land. The feature was first observed and roughly delineated from aerial photographs taken by the Byrd Antarctic Expedition, 1928–30. It was named by the Advisory Committee on Antarctic Names for Commander W.R. Cronenwett, U.S. Navy, Photographic Officer for Deep Freeze II, 1956–57, and Public Information Officer for Task Group 43.1 during Deep Freeze 1962.

See also 
 List of Antarctic and sub-Antarctic islands

References 

Islands of Marie Byrd Land